Yuri Romanov (born 24 July 1982, Minsk, Belarus) is a Belarusian professional boxer who fights in the lightweight division.

Professional career

Debut fight
Romanov's first fight as a professional boxer was in April 2002, in  Molodechno, Belarus, when he beat fellow debutant Anton Serov with a seventh round knockout.

First title fight
After only two fights, Romanov fought Polish boxer Krzysztof Bienias in Wroclaw, Poland for the IBF Youth Light Welterweight Title. Romanov lost a close ten round points decision.

References

External links
 

1982 births
Living people
People from Maladzyechna
Lightweight boxers
Belarusian male boxers
Sportspeople from Minsk Region
21st-century Belarusian people